Leukocyte immunoglobulin-like receptor pseudogene 2 is a protein that in humans is encoded by the LILRP2 gene.

References

Further reading 

Pseudogenes